The 2013–14 Grand Rapids Griffins season was the franchise's 13th season in the American Hockey League.

Off-season
Following the Grand Rapids Griffins' Calder Cup-winning season last year, several of the players were called up to the Detroit Red Wings, including forwards Joakim Andersson and Tomáš Tatar; and defensemen Danny DeKeyser, Brian Lashoff and Brendan Smith. There was a great deal of roster movements between the two teams throughout the off-season, with some players getting repeatedly called back and forth, which meant Griffins coach Jeff Blashill could not finalize the roster or power play and penalty kill teams until just before the regular season began. Ten of the 20 players on Detroit's starting roster had played with Grand Rapids the previous year. Other Griffins departures included defenseman Chad Billins, goaltender Jordan Pearce, and forwards Jan Muršak, and Francis Paré. Winger Cory Emmerton began the regular season with Detroit after Patrick Eaves was placed on long-term injured reserve.

Gustav Nyquist was sent down to Grand Rapids from Detroit, but was not expected to remain there long. The move was primarily intended to keep the team under its salary cap, since Nyquist could be transferred without having to clear waivers. The Griffins signed several new skaters during the off-season, giving the roster a mix of veterans and young prospects. New additions included goaltender Jared Coreau; defensemen Alexey Marchenko, Richard Nedomlel and Xavier Ouellet; forwards Martin Frk, David McIntyre and Marek Tvrdon. McIntyre was the only one of the seven with previous American Hockey League experience. The team re-signed defensemen Nathan Paetsch and Brennan Evans, and forwards Triston Grant and team captain Jeff Hoggan, as well as several skaters who had played only a handful of games the previous year, including center Calle Järnkrok, winger Teemu Pulkkinen, and defenseman Ryan Sproul.

After a training camp that began September 23 at Van Andel Arena, the Griffins played a pair of off-season games against the Lake Erie Monsters, although eight of their players were absent due to a call-up to Detroit. Grand Rapids won the first game 3–2 in a shootout, with Frk scoring the sole shootout goal and McCollum making 36 saves and stopped five shootout shots. Lake Erie won the second game in a 2–0 shutout. Center Landon Ferraro, the team's third-highest score the previous year, suffered a foot injury during the off-season that kept him out of the first two weeks of the regular season.

Regular season
On October 4, the Grand Rapids Griffins won their season opener against the Rochester Americans by a score of 8–1, setting a franchise record for largest margin of victory in a season debut, breaking the previous record of four goals in 2004. Gustav Nyquist and Adam Almquist led the scoring with three points apiece.

Standings

Conference standings

Schedule and results

Pre-season

Regular season
<div class="center">

Playoffs

Player statistics

Skaters
Note: GP = Games played; G = Goals; A = Assists; Pts = Points; +/− = Plus/minus; PIM = Penalty minutes

Goaltenders
Note: GP = Games played; TOI = Time on ice; W = Wins; L = Losses; GA = Goals against; GAA = Goals against average; SV = Saves; SA = Shots against; SV% = Save percentage; SO = Shutouts; G = Goals; A = Assists; PIM = Penalty minutes

†Denotes player spent time with another team before joining team. Stats reflect time with the team only.
‡Left the team mid-season
*Rookie

Final roster
Updated April 19, 2014

|}

References

External links
Grand Rapids Griffins official site

Grand
Grand
Grand Rapids Griffins